Burkina Sign Language (in French: Langue des signes burkinabé or Langue des signes mossi) is the indigenous sign language of the Deaf community in the capital of Burkina Faso, Ouagadougou. Deaf education in Burkina is in American Sign Language (ASL) and Burkina Faso Sign Language is considered to be an ASL based creole language.
There are 55,500 deaf people in Burkina

References

Sign language isolates
Languages of Burkina Faso